Ribes nevadense (sometimes spelled R. nevadaense) is a species of currant known by the common names Sierra currant and mountain pink currant.

Distribution
Ribes nevadense is native to several of the mountain ranges in California, including the Peninsular Ranges, Transverse Ranges, Klamath Mountains, and the Sierra Nevada where its distribution extends into western Nevada. It has been found in Oregon, as well.

Description
The glandular leaves are up to 8 centimeters (3.2 inches) long and are divided shallowly into a few dully toothed lobes.

The inflorescence is a dense raceme of up to 20 flowers hanging pendent or held erect on the branches. Each flower has opens into a corolla-like array of five pinkish red sepals with five smaller white petals in a tube at the center.

The fruit is an edible blue-black berry under a centimeter wide. It is somewhat waxy in texture and studded with glandular hairs.

References

External links
Jepson Manual Treatment - Ribes nevadense
Ribes nevadense — Calphotos Photo gallery, University of California

nevadense
Flora of California
Flora of Nevada
Flora of Oregon
Natural history of the California chaparral and woodlands
Natural history of the California Coast Ranges
Natural history of the Peninsular Ranges
Natural history of the Transverse Ranges
Plants described in 1855
Flora without expected TNC conservation status